HMAS Pirie (ACPB 87), named for the city of Port Pirie, South Australia, is an Armidale-class patrol boat of the Royal Australian Navy (RAN).

Design and construction

The semi-displacement vee hull is fabricated from aluminium alloy, and each vessel is built to a combination of Det Norske Veritas standards for high-speed light craft and RAN requirements.

The main armament of the Armidale class is a Rafael Typhoon stabilised  gun mount fitted with an M242 Bushmaster cannon. Two  machine guns are also carried. Boarding operations are performed by two , waterjet propelled rigid-hulled inflatable boats (RHIBs). Each RHIB is stored in a dedicated cradle and davit, and is capable of operating independently from the patrol boat as it carries its own communications, navigation, and safety equipment.

Each patrol boat has a standard ship's company of 21 personnel, with a maximum of 29. The Armidales do not have a permanently assigned ship's company; instead, they are assigned to divisions at a ratio of two vessels to three companies, which rotate through the vessels and allow the Armidales to spend more time at sea, without compromising sailors' rest time or training requirements. A 20-berth auxiliary accommodation compartment was included in the design for the transportation of soldiers, illegal fishermen, or unauthorised arrivals; in the latter two cases, the compartment could be secured from the outside. However, a malfunction in the sewerage treatment facilities aboard  in August 2006 pumped hydrogen sulphide and carbon monoxide into the compartment, non-fatally poisoning four sailors working inside, after which use of the compartment for accommodation was banned across the class.

Pirie was constructed by Austal at their shipyard in Henderson, Western Australia. She was commissioned into the RAN in her namesake city on 15 July 2006.

Operational history
Pirie is assigned to Assail Division, is based in Darwin and performs border protection and fisheries protection patrols.

In 2006, the patrol boat was involved in unmanned aerial vehicle trials at Port Hedland, South Australia. In November, Pirie was formally assigned to border protection operations under Operation Resolute.

During 2008, Pirie participated in Exercise Singaroo with Australian and Singaporean vessels.

She attended the 2009 Chinese International Fleet Review.

During 2010, the vessel attended the Timor Fleet Review, then participated in that year's Exercise Cassowary, along with Australian and Indonesian units. Pirie was one of the ships that responded when a Suspected Illegal Entry Vessel carrying asylum seekers ran aground and sank off Christmas Island on 15 December 2010.

The vessel was decommissioned in Darwin on 26 March 2021.

Citations

References
Books

 The chapter is available separately as Semaphore, Issue 4, 2006 in PDF and HTML formats.

Journal and news articles

Websites and other media
 Australian Department of Defence media release New patrol boat HMAS Pirie commissions in traditional Navy ceremony

External links
Royal Australian Navy webpage for HMAS Pirie (II)

Naval ships of Australia
Armidale-class patrol boats
Ships built by Austal
2006 ships